The Peaceable Kingdom: An American Saga (1972) is a historical novel in two parts by Quaker author Jan de Hartog.  It describes the first meeting of George Fox and Margaret Fell, the latter's conversion, and a portion of the history of colonial Pennsylvania.

The allure of the novel is in the characters' metamorphosis from self-serving often unlikable characters, to people who work for the good of others.  The story shows the precedence of Quaker prison reform and social justice.  It also illustrates plain speech and gives a fairly accurate portrayal of a Quaker Meeting.

1972 American novels
American historical novels
Quakerism
Novels set in Pennsylvania
Novels set in the American colonial era